Kindeyevo is a rural locality (a village) in Sosnovskoye Rural Settlement, Vologodsky District, Vologda Oblast, Russia. The population was 14 as of 2002. There are 3 streets.

Geography 
Kindeyevo is located 20 km west of Vologda (the district's administrative centre) by road. Isakovo is the nearest rural locality.

References 

Rural localities in Vologodsky District